Katrien Houtmeyers (born 22 January 1981) is a Belgian businesswoman and politician active within the N-VA party.

Biography
Houtmeyers was born and raised in Leuven. In 2003 she obtained a master's degree in psychology at the KU Leuven. She founded a communications company before becoming the co-owner of a garden furniture store. In the Belgian municipal elections of 2018, she was elected municipal councilor in Leuven. Since the 2019 Belgian federal election, she has served as an MP in the Chamber of Representatives for the Flemish Brabant constituency.

References 

1981 births
Living people
People from Leuven
New Flemish Alliance politicians
Members of the Chamber of Representatives (Belgium)
21st-century Belgian politicians
21st-century Belgian women politicians
KU Leuven alumni
Women local politicians
Belgian city councillors